(born May 8, 1974) is a Japanese model, singer, actress. As an actress she portrayed Sadako Yamamura in the 1995 Japanese TV film Ring.

Miura has appeared in several V-Cinema films. In 1996 she appeared in an entry in the popular Rapeman series. Miura's episode, The Rape-Man of Edo takes the concept of the series into samurai milieu.

Partial filmography
 1993.08.27　ネオ極道伝　ＫＩＺＡ (KSS)
 1994.01.14　新百合族　先生、キスしたことありますか？ (Nikkatsu Video)
 1994.01.29　凶銃ルガーＰＯ８ (Excellent Films)
 1994.04.28　新百合族２ (Nikkatsu Video)
 1994.06.24　ツッパリ・ハイ・スクール　武闘派高校伝 (KSS)
 1995.06.09　新百合族３ (Nikkatsu Video)
 1995.06.23　ＮＩＮＥ－ＯＮＥ　くノ一妖獣伝説 (Nain-wan: Kunoichi yôjuu densetsu) (JVD)
 1995.10.20　双頭の悪魔 (Pony Canyon)
 1995.12.01　教科書にないッ！ (Pink Pineapple)
 1996.05.10　痴漢日記３　尻を撫でまわしつづけた男 (Toei Video)
 1996.06.28　監禁逃亡　恥辱の令嬢 (SEN)
 1996.11.01　 (Gyaga Communications)

Photobooks (partial list)
 1994-05-10 
 1995-01-10 Reve

References

Sources

External links
 

Living people
1973 births
Japanese actresses
Japanese female adult models
Actors from Shizuoka Prefecture
Models from Shizuoka Prefecture
Musicians from Shizuoka Prefecture